KBTT (103.7 FM, "103.7 Tha Beat") is a radio station licensed to Haughton, Louisiana and broadcasting to Shreveport with a Mainstream urban musical format. it is owned by Alpha Media, LLC, through licensee Alpha Media Licensee LLC.  Its studios are located just north of downtown Shreveport, and the transmitter is in Eastwood, Louisiana.

Around the late 1990s to early 2000 KBTT, originally called "K-103 Tha Beat," was launched with a Rhythmic Contemporary format originally as one of the first competitors to KMJJ.  KBTT's sister station KDKS was launched at the same time as an Urban Contemporary format.  But once KDKS turned its format over to Urban AC to compete with newcomer KVMA-FM (KMJJ's sister), KBTT tilted its format over to Mainstream Urban since Shreveport-Bossier City market has a huge African American population to support it as opposed to rhythmic.  It is the syndicated home of the Rickey Smiley Morning Show.

External links 

Radio stations in Louisiana
Mainstream urban radio stations in the United States
Alpha Media radio stations